Nagi Ganapathy Naganathan is the current president of the Oregon Institute of Technology and the former dean of the College of Engineering at the University of Toledo.

Education 
Naganathan received his bachelor's degree in Mechanical Engineering from Regional Engineering College, Tiruchirappalli ( now known as National Institute of Technology, Tiruchirappalli), master's degree from Clarkson University and his doctorate of philosophy degree from Oklahoma State University.

Career 
He was named interim president of the University of Toledo serving since July 1, 2014. In November 2016, Naganathan was selected as president of the Oregon Institute of Technology. National Institute of Technology, Tiruchirappalli awarded him the Distinguished Alumnus Award in 2007.

In 2021, faculty at Oregon Institute of Technology held a vote of no confidence in Naganathan, citing a disregard of university policy, shared governance, and fiscal management. The vote passed with approval from roughly 92% of faculty.

References

External links
 https://web.archive.org/web/20120705045644/http://www.eng.utoledo.edu/mime/~nnaganat/

Year of birth missing (living people)
Living people
Oregon Institute of Technology
American mechanical engineers
Indian mechanical engineers
Heads of universities and colleges in the United States
National Institute of Technology, Tiruchirappalli alumni
University of Toledo faculty